Gelu (also Romanized as Gelū; also known as Āhūān-e Vasaţ and Gelū Āhūgān) is a village in Sorkh Qaleh Rural District, in the Central District of Qaleh Ganj County, Kerman Province, Iran. At the 2006 census, its population was 1,235, in 269 families.

References 

Populated places in Qaleh Ganj County